Annona salzmannii, the beach sugar apple, is a tree native to Brazil.

It is an extremely rare Annona bearing orange skinned fruits up to one pound in weight with a sweet and very tasty white pulp. The fruit is prized in its native range, but is rare and never cultivated.

Those weird and wonderful fruit trees are like A. scleroderma and A. crassiflora.

A. salzmannii is a food source for golden-headed lion tamarins (one of 155 tree species useful to the tamarins).

References

salzmannii
Tropical fruit